Jackie-O Motherfucker is an American experimental music group that formed in Portland, Oregon in 1994.

Biography
Jackie-O Motherfucker began as a duo consisting of multi-instrumentalist Tom Greenwood and saxophonist Nester Bucket. The group is a collective with a shifting membership that has included more than forty members drawn from the U.S. experimental scene. As of 2008, the core of the group is focused on founding member Greenwood.

Jackie-O Motherfucker embraces free improvisation, drawing from a variety of subgenres including various folk musics of the world (American folk and blues, Native American song, traditional English folk ballads, etc.), free jazz, field recordings, psychedelia, drone, and noise rock. 

The group's first three albums were limited-run vinyl-only releases on now-defunct Portland label Imp Records. Their first widely distributed album, Fig.5, was released in 2000 and was followed by a series of recordings, including the more meandering Liberation and the folk-oriented Flags for the Sacred Harp, which drew from traditional blues and gospel sources.

By this point the group were enjoying a higher profile, including performances at the ATP festival curated by Sonic Youth and Thurston Moore and a cover feature on The Wire.

Since then, the group has had recordings released by a variety of labels before settling down with the London-based label Fire Records from 2008's Blood of Life. The group also operates its own label of CD-R live recordings, the U-Sound Archive, which features live recordings from Jackie-O Motherfucker as well as other like-minded artists such as Double Leopards, Sunroof!, Decaer Pinga, and Vibracathedral Orchestra.

Discography
Alchemy... Shit to Gold (1995), Imp Records
Cross Pollinate (1996), Imp Records
Flat Fixed (1998), Imp Records
WOW (1999), Fisheye
Fig.5 (2000), Road Cone
The Magick Fire Music (2001), Ecstatic Peace!
Liberation (2001), Road Cone
split with Vibracathedral Orchestra (2001), Textile
Change (2002), Textile
Europe 2002 live album (2003), Cast Exotic
From the Earth to the Spheres Vol. 3 with My Cat Is an Alien (2005), Very Friendly
Flags of the Sacred Harp (2005), ATP Recordings
The Grave (2006), DotDotDot
America Mystica (2006), Very Friendly
Freaker Pipe (2007), U-Sound
Valley of Fire (2007), Textile Records
Fig.5 (2007), ATP (reissue of 2000 album)
The Blood of Life Live Album (2008), Fire Records
Ballads of the Revolution (2009), Fire Records
Earth Sound System (2011), Fire Records
Bloom (2018), Textile Records

Members
Tom Greenwood – guitar, turntables, percussion, vocals
Eva Salens – vocals, keyboards, viola, tapes
Nick Bindeman – guitar
Brian Mumford – guitar, electronics
Jed Bindeman – drums

Previous members
Jef Brown – guitar, saxophone
John Flaming – saxophone
Nester Bucket – saxophone
Michael Henrickson – drums
Jessie Carrot – drums
Barry Hampton – drums, percussion
Adam Forkner – guitar
Natalie Mering – vocals, guitar
Josh Stevenson – bass, keyboards, guitar
Theo Angell – vocals, guitars, tapes
Honey Owens – vocals, guitar, keyboards
Dana Valatka – drums, electronic percussion, vocals
Brooke Crouser – guitar
Samara Lubelski – violin
Josh Diamond – guitar
  Andy Cvar
Jack Denning – bass guitar, synthesizers, 808

References

American experimental musical groups
American post-rock groups
Musical groups from Portland, Oregon
Musical groups established in 1994
1994 establishments in Oregon
Ecstatic Peace! artists
ATP Recordings artists